Godwins may refer to

House of Godwin, a leading family in 11th century Anglo-Saxon England
Rufus Godwins, Nigerian civil servant.